Presidential elections were held in Ecuador in May 1975. The result was a victory for incumbent president Gabriel García Moreno, who received over 99% of the vote. García was assassinated in August and fresh elections were held in October.

Results

References

1875 05
Ecuador
1875 in Ecuador
1875